The Tampa Bay Terror is the name of an indoor soccer team based in the Tampa Bay, Florida area that competed in the defunct National Professional Soccer League (NPSL). The team existed for two seasons before folding: 1995–1996 and 1996–1997. The team's home games were held at the Bayfront Center in St. Petersburg. In the two seasons that the Terror played in the NPSL, the average attendance was 1,950 per game.

Year-by-year record

Head coach
 Kenny Cooper Sr. 1995–1996
  Perry Van der Beck 1996–1997

Soccer clubs in Tampa, Florida
Soccer clubs in Florida
Defunct indoor soccer clubs in the United States
National Professional Soccer League (1984–2001) teams
1995 establishments in Florida
1997 disestablishments in Florida
Sports in St. Petersburg, Florida
Association football clubs established in 1995
Association football clubs disestablished in 1997